Pageant is a 2008 documentary film directed and produced together by Ron Davis and Stewart Halpern. The film explored the behind-the-scenes dramas and realities of the 34th Miss Gay America Contest held in 2004. The film's central theme was the universal desire to be beautiful, noticed and chosen. The film garnered 10 film festival awards before airing on the Sundance Channel in 2010.

Critical response
While some reviewers, such as Martin Tsai from The Village Voice felt that the film only skimmed along the surface insanity saying that "filmmakers Ron Davis and Stewart Halpern-Fingerhut's treatment is only skin-deep, eschewing any exploration of gender politics or psychological effects induced by the ubiquitous ugly-duckling-turned-swan narrative." Other reviewers such as Nathan Lee in the New York Times felt that it was "not without its charm, and it's touching, in a goofy sort of way, to see how seriously everyone takes it." George Williamson in An Eye for Film described it as "... an entertaining portrait of some wonderfully larger than life characters, a mind blowing amount of effort and an incredible desire to win." Michael Klemm from Cinemaqueer recommended it saying "If you just want a good time, you can't go wrong with Pageant. Anyone who likes to indulge their inner divas should be enthralled." Rotten Tomatoes gave it an 85% approval rating.

Awards and nominations
 Winner, Audience Award, Best Documentary Frameline 32
 Winner, Audience Award, Best Documentary, Florida Film Festival
 Official Selection, Slamdance Festival
 Winner, Best Documentary, Fresno Reel Pride
 Winner, Best Documentary, Outflix Film Festival
 Winner, Best Documentary, Chicago Image Out festival
 Winner, Best Documentary, Honolulu Rainbow Festival
 Winner, Audience Award, Best Feature, Fire Island Film and Video
 Winner, Jury Award, Best Documentary, Reelings 2008
 Winner, Audience Award, Best Documentary Rochester ImageOut Festival

References

External links
 
 

2008 films
Documentary films about LGBT topics
2008 documentary films
American documentary films
Documentary films about beauty pageants
2008 LGBT-related films
2000s American films